Josh Todd and the Conflict is an American hard rock band formed by Buckcherry members Josh Todd (vocals) and Stevie D (guitarist). The band released their debut album Year of The Tiger in September 2017. The album was co-produced by Stevie D and Stone Temple Pilots drummer Eric Kretz.

Band members

Current members
Josh Todd – lead vocals 
Stevie D. – guitar, backing vocals 
Gregg Cash - Bass guitar
Sean Winchester – drums

Discography

Studio albums
Year of The Tiger (2017)

References

2017 establishments in California
Hard rock musical groups from California
Musical groups established in 2017
Musical groups from Los Angeles